Brock is an English and German surname.

Notable people with the surname "Brock" include

A
Alex Brock, British actor
Alice Brock (born 1941), American artist
Allison Brock (born 1979), American equestrian
Amber Brock (born 1980), American author
Andrew C. Brock (born 1974), American politician

B
Bazon Brock (born 1936), German art critic
Bill Brock (1930–2021), American politician
Bob Brock, American softball coach
Brian Brock (born 1970), Scottish-American theologian
Bryan Brock, American football player
Buddy Brock, American songwriter
Burr Brock Sr. (1891–1968), American lawyer and politician

C
Calvin Brock (born 1975), American boxer
Calvin Brock (basketball) (born 1986), American basketball player
Carol Brock (1923–2020), American food critic
Cassie Brock (born 1991), Australian cricketer
C. E. Brock (1870–1938), English illustrator
Chad Brock (born 1963), American singer
Charley Brock (1916–1987), American football player
Chris Brock (born 1970), American baseball player
Clyde Brock (born 1940), Canadian football player

D
Dan W. Brock (1937–2020), American philosopher
Daniel de Lisle Brock (1762–1842), English judge
Darrell Brock Jr., American politician
Dave Brock (born 1941), English singer-songwriter
David Brock (disambiguation), multiple people
Debbie Brock, American basketball player
Deidre Brock (born 1961), Australian-Scottish politician
Dennis Brock (born 1995), German footballer
Denton Brock (born 1971), English cricketer
Dieter Brock (born 1951), American football player
Dorothy Brock (1886–1969), English teacher

E
Edmond Brock (1882–1952), English painter
Eduardo Brock (born 1991), Brazilian footballer
Edwin Brock (1927–1997), British poet
Edwin C. Brock (1946–2015), American historian
Eric Brock (disambiguation), multiple people
Eugene Brock (1853–1911), American politician
Euline Brock (1932–2018), American politician

F
Frank Arthur Brock (1888–1918), British pilot
Fred Brock (born 1974), American football player
Frederick Brock (disambiguation), multiple people

G
Geoff Brock (born 1950), Australian politician
Geoffrey Brock (born 1964), American poet
George Brock (disambiguation), multiple people
Gillian Brock, New Zealand philosopher
Greg Brock (disambiguation), multiple people
Gustav Brock (1881–1945), American painter
Gustav Edvard Brock (1816–1878), Danish lawyer and politician

H
Håkan Brock (born 1961), Swedish boxer
Harry B. Brock Jr. (1925–2015), American banker
Hayley Brock (born 1992), American soccer player
Hella Brock (1919–2020), German musicologist
Henry Brock, American football coach
Herman Brock Jr. (born 1970), Dutch musician
H. M. Brock (1875–1960), British painter
Hugh Brock (1914–1985), British editor

I
Isaac Brock (disambiguation), multiple people

J
Jacob Brock (1810–1876), American steamboat captain
Jason V. Brock (born 1970), American writer
Jeffrey Brock (born 1970), American mathematician
Jeffry Hall Brock (1850–1915), Canadian businessman
Jeremy Brock (born 1959), British writer
Jesse Brock (born 1972), American artist
Jim Brock (1937–1994), American college baseball coach
Joey Brock (born 1988), Dutch footballer
John Brock (disambiguation), multiple people

K
Kadar Brock (born 1980), American artist
Kara Brock (born 1974), American actress
Kathy Brock (born 1959), American television personality
Keenan Brock (born 1992), American sprinter
Kevin Brock (disambiguation), multiple people
Kristy Brock, American professor

L
Larry Brock (born 1964), Canadian politician
Laura Brock (born 1989), Australian footballer
Laurence Brock (1879–1949), British civil servant
Lawrence Brock (1906–1968), American politician
Lou Brock (disambiguation), multiple people
Ludvig Frederik Brock (1774–1853), Norwegian military officer
Lyla Pinch Brock (born 1944), Canadian historian
Lynn Brock (1877–1943), Irish novelist

M
Malene Brock, Danish cricketer
Margaret Susan Brock (born 1948), Australian professor
Matt Brock (born 1966), American football player
Matthew Brock (disambiguation), multiple people
Mel Brock (disambiguation), multiple people
Michael Brock (1920–2014), British historian
Mona Lee Brock (1932–2019), American teacher

N
Napoleon Murphy Brock (born 1945), American singer
Niels Brock (1731–1802), Danish merchant

O
Osmond Brock (1869–1947), English naval officer

P
Paul Brock (musician) (born 1944), Irish musician
Pete Brock (born 1936), American race car driver
Pete Brock (American football) (born 1954), American football player
Peter Brock (disambiguation), multiple people
Phillip Brock (born 1982), American football player

R
Raheem Brock (born 1978), American football player
Ralph E. Brock (1881–1959), American forester
Randy Brock (born 1943), American politician
Ray L. Brock Jr. (1922–2002), American judge
Raymond Brock (1936–2008), English bridge player
Reginald Walter Brock (1874–1935), Canadian geologist
Renée Brock (1912–1980), Belgian writer
Richard Brock (born 1938), English film producer
Rita Nakashima Brock (born 1950), Japanese-American scholar
Robert Brock (disambiguation), multiple people
Roby Brock, American journalist
Roslyn Brock (born 1965), American activist
Rovenia M. Brock, American nutritionist
Roy Gerard Corcor Brock (1884–1968), British army officer
Russell Brock (1903–1980), British surgeon
Russell Brock (volleyball), American volleyball coach

S
Sally Brock (born 1953), English bridge player
Sean Brock (born 1978), American chef
Sebastian Brock (born 1938), British historian
S. F. Brock (1880–1918), American race car driver
Stan Brock (born 1958), American football player
Stanley Brock (1931–1991), American actor
Stephanie Brock, American chemist
Stevie Brock (born 1990), American singer
Stuart Brock (born 1976), English footballer

T
Tarrik Brock (born 1973), American baseball player
Thomas Brock (disambiguation), multiple people
Timothy Brock (born 1963), American conductor
Tony Brock (born 1954), British drummer
Tramaine Brock (born 1988), American football player
Tricia Brock (born 1979), American singer-songwriter
Tricia Brock (director), American film director

U
Ulrik Brock (born 1945), Danish sailor

W
Wayne Brock (born 1948), American scout leader
William Brock (disambiguation), multiple people

Z
Zoë Brock (born 1974), New Zealand model

Fictional characters
Eddie Brock, a character in the comic book series Marvel Comics
Tyler Brock, a character in the novel Tai-Pan

See also
Brock (disambiguation), a disambiguation page for "Brock"
Brock (given name), a page for people with the given name "Brock"
General Brock (disambiguation), a disambiguation page for Generals surnamed "Brock"
Senator Brock (disambiguation), a disambiguation page for Senators surnamed "Brock"

English-language surnames
German-language surnames